Ritchie Hawkyard (born 21 January 1986), also known by the nicknames of "Hawky", and "Titch", is a Scotland former international rugby league footballer who most recently played at  for Keighley Cougars in Betfred League 1.

Background
Hawkyard was born in Huddersfield, West Yorkshire, England.

Playing career
A product of Bradford Bulls senior academy Hawkyard, 21, was drafted in for Paul Deacon and made his début against Huddersfield Giants in round 14 of 2007 Super League season playing as a stand off.

At the end of the 2007 season having made three appearances for the Bulls, Hawkyard signed for Swinton Lions. After nine seasons with Swinton during which he scored 58 tries in 182 appearances for the Lions Hawkyard was captain of the team when helping them to the league 1 leaders in 2011 as well as the League 1 Play off final against Keighley Cougars in 2015, Hawkyard joined Keighley Cougars for the start of the 2016 season.

After being ever present for Keighley in the 2016 season and in his first season helping them win the ipro cup final, Hawkyard missed a number of games of the 2017 season after suffering severe facial injuries in a game against Hunslet at Easter and did not play again until July.

The end of the 2018 season saw Hawkyard leave Keighley to join Oldham due to the financial uncertainty at the Keighley club. Hawkyard was also Granted a 1-year testimonial starting in 2018 for his services to Rugby League. During the 2019 season Hawkyard made 22 appearances for Oldham scoring 12 tries and helping Oldham win promotion to the Championship with a man-of-the-match performance in the League 1 play-off final against Newcastle Thunder.

Hawkyard rejoined Keighley in October 2019 on a one-year contract but on 17 December 2019 announced his immediate retirement from the game, only to have a change of heart and rejoin the club in January 2020. Hawkyard was released by Keighley at the end of the aborted 2020 season and became player-coach at amateur side Newsome Panthers helping them win promotion in his first season at the club.

Representative
He is of Scottish descent and has played for Scotland at international level, playing in a friendly game against France in 2007.

References

1986 births
Living people
Bradford Bulls players
English people of Scottish descent
English rugby league players
Keighley Cougars players
Oldham R.L.F.C. players
Rugby league fullbacks
Rugby league players from Huddersfield
Scotland national rugby league team players
Swinton Lions players